Faro Airport, officially Gago Coutinho Airport (Aeroporto Gago Coutinho), is located   west of Faro in Portugal. The airport opened in July 1965 being the main gateway to the year-round resort region of the Algarve with nine million passengers using the facility in 2019.

History

Faro International Airport is located 4 km from Faro, the capital city of Algarve in Portugal. Situated in the southern coast of Portugal, the airport was constructed during the 1960s and inaugurated in 1965. The Portuguese Government was the owner of Faro airport until the 2010s when Vinci Group became its owner. The national airport authority ANA Aeroportos de Portugal has been its operator. Along with the airports in Lisbon, Porto, Ponta Delgada, Santa Maria, Horta, Flores, Madeira, and Porto Santo, the airport's concessions to provide support to civil aviation were conceded to ANA Aeroportos de Portugal on 18 December 1998, under provisions of decree 404/98. With this concession, ANA became responsible for the planning, development and construction of future infrastructure.

Since its opening in 1966 to the 2000s, Faro airport has had two major developments: the new passenger terminal building in 1989, and its enlargement in 2001. Faced with growing traffic demand and passenger safety and satisfaction needs, the development plan for 2009–2013 saw Faro airport undergo extensive improvements to runway and infrastructure, as well as a widespread renovation of the airport terminal and commercial areas. The airport authority announced an expansion programme for Faro airport in February 2010. Phase I of the expansion started in 2010 and was completed by 2011. Phase II began in 2011 and was completed by 2013. Faro International Airport handled 5,447,200 passengers and recorded 39,789 aircraft movements in 2008. When the Phase II expansion was completed, the annual capacity of the airport increased from six million to eight million passengers. Passengers handled per hour increased to 3,000, the number of aircraft handled per hour increased to 30, and aircraft parking bays increased from 22 to 33. Additional shops and waiting areas were constructed as part of the expansion. In Phase I, new aircraft stands and taxiways were planned to be constructed. A new instrument landing system (ILS) was installed at the runway along with the installation of a glide reflection mirror. The security area at the runway was also expanded. Phase II involved the renovation of the passenger terminal and the improvement of the landside access.

As of 2019, Faro Airport is capable of handling nine million passengers a year. There are 22 stands of which 16 are remote, with 60 check-in desks and 36 boarding gates.

In June 2022 it was announced that the airport would carry Gago Coutinho's name in honour of the navigator and admiral who, in 1922, together with the aviator Sacadura Cabral, accomplished the First aerial crossing of the South Atlantic in the seaplane Lusitânia, named after the Roman Empire name for what would become Portugal. The airport name became official in September 2022. At the same time it was announced the commissioning of a solar power plant with a capacity of 3MWp, enabling to produce 30% of the airport's electricity needs, reducing  emissions by more than 1,500 tonnes per year.

Airlines and destinations
The following airlines operate regular scheduled direct passenger flights at Faro Airport:

Statistics

Ground transport

Car
The airport is close to the A22 highway, with connections throughout the Algarve and direct to Lisbon and Spain. Faro airport has 3 different car parking areas. The closest parking area is called "Parking P0 / P1 – Classic", used for short-term visitors, while parking areas P2 and P3 are used for longer term car storage.

Kiss and Fly is the name for a form of fast parking at the airport.

Bus
Airport bus routes 14 and 16 run each day between Faro Airport and Faro city centre bus station. From the bus station there are connections to most other Portuguese cities as well as to many Spanish destinations. The airport bus route is currently run by a company called "Proximo".

Railway
A study into a rail link to the airport was undertaken in 2018.

Taxis
Public taxis are available from the airport and operate 24/7.

Ride hailing
Ride hailing companies' services are widely available in the area.

Accolades
In 2012, Airports Council International gave Faro Airport the title of Best Improvement in Europe.

Accidents and incidents
 On 21 December 1992, Martinair Flight 495 sustained a hard landing in bad weather at Faro Airport, killing 54 passengers and two crew out of a total of 340 people on board.
 On 24 October 2011, an overnight storm collapsed portions of terminal roofs and blew out most windows in the control tower. Four people were slightly injured, one severely.

See also
 Transport in Portugal
 List of airports in Portugal

References

External links

 Official website
 

Faro Airport
Airport
Buildings and structures in the Algarve